The 2009 season of Úrvalsdeild karla was the 98th season of top-tier football in Iceland. It is also known as Pepsideild for sponsoring reasons. It began on 10 May 2009 and ended on 26 September 2009. Defending champions FH earned their second consecutive title. Stjarnan once again joined the elite division of Icelandic football after a 9-year absence, as well as ÍBV who return after a 5-year stint in the 1. deild karla.

Teams and venues

League table

Results
Each team play every opponent once home and away for a total of 22 matches.

Top goalscorers

16 goals
  Björgólfur Takefusa (KR)

14 goals
  Atli Viðar Björnsson (FH)

13 goals
  Alfreð Finnbogason (Breiðablik)

11 goals
  Gilles Mbang Ondo (Grindavík)

10 goals
  Atli Guðnason (FH)
  Matthías Vilhjálmsson (FH)

9 goals
  Arnar Már Björgvinsson (Stjarnan)
  Albert Brynjar Ingason (Fylkir)

8 goals
  Gunnar Örn Jónsson (KR)
  Kristinn Steindórsson (Breiðablik)

Source fotbolti.net

External links
 Official website 

Úrvalsdeild karla (football) seasons
1
Iceland
Iceland